Paulina Veloso Muñoz (born 1988) is a Chilean lawyer who is a member of the Chilean Constitutional Convention.

On 10 December 2021, he was part of José Antonio Kast's candidacy in the 2021 Chilean general election ballotage.

References

External links
 
 
 

Living people
 1987 births
21st-century Chilean lawyers
21st-century Chilean politicians
Members of the Chilean Constitutional Convention
21st-century Chilean women politicians
People from Lota, Chile